Bagus Setiadi (born 24 June 1966) is a retired male badminton player from Indonesia. Setiadi retired after one of his eyes was injured hit by the shuttlecock smashed by his sparring partner, Imay Hendra, during regular training in the 1990s.

Career
He won the bronze medal at the 1991 IBF World Championships in men's doubles with Imay Hendra. They had won men's doubles together at the inaugural edition of Finnish Open in 1990. Setiadi was part of Indonesia national team at the 1992 Thomas Cup.

Achievements

IBF World Championships 
Men's Doubles

IBF World Grand Prix 
The World Badminton Grand Prix sanctioned by International Badminton Federation (IBF) from 1983 to 2006.

Men's doubles

 IBF Grand Prix tournament
 IBF Grand Prix Finals tournament

References

External links 
 Results 1989-1993

1966 births
Living people
Balinese people
Indonesian male badminton players
Indonesian Hindus
20th-century Indonesian people